USS Elliot refers to two ships of United States Navy:

 , a 
 , a

See also
 

United States Navy ship names